The Tapuaeroa River is a river of the Gisborne Region of New Zealand's North Island. It flows southeast from its sources in the Raukumara Range, joining its waters with those of the Mata River close to the town of Ruatoria, the resulting flow becoming the Waiapu River.

See also
List of rivers of New Zealand

References

Rivers of the Gisborne District
Rivers of New Zealand